Guylaine Tremblay   (born October 14, 1960) is a Canadian actress from Quebec. She is most noted for her performance in the film Summit Circle (Contre toute espérance), for which she won the Prix Jutra for Best Actress at the 10th Jutra Awards in 2008.

She was also nominated in the same category at the 2nd Jutra Awards in 2010 for Matroni and Me (Matroni et moi), at the 11th Jutra Awards in 2009 for Honey, I'm in Love (Le Grand Départ) and at the 13th Jutra Awards in 2011 for Mourning for Anna (Trois temps après la mort d'Anna), and for Best Supporting Actress at the 3rd Jutra Awards in 2001 for Life After Love (La Vie après l'amour) and at the 6th Jutra Awards in 2004 for 8:17 p.m. Darling Street (20h17 rue Darling).

Filmography

Film

Television

References

External links

1960 births
20th-century Canadian actresses
21st-century Canadian actresses
Canadian film actresses
Canadian stage actresses
Canadian television actresses
Actresses from Quebec
French Quebecers
People from Capitale-Nationale
Living people
Best Actress Jutra and Iris Award winners